2005 general election  may refer to:

 2005 British Columbia general election
 2005 Anguillan general election
 2005 Caymanian general election
 2005 Central African general election
 2005 Dominican general election
 2005 Ethiopian general election
 2005 Honduran general election
 2005 Japanese general election
 2005 Jersey general election
 2005 Lebanese general election
 2005 Liberian general election
 2005 Mauritian general election
 2005 New Zealand general election
 2005 Niuean general election
 2005 Northern Territory general election, in Australia
 2005 Tanzanian general election
 2005 Thai general election
 2005 Tongan general election
 2005 United Kingdom general election